Markham Transit was a public transit system for the town of Markham, Ontario, Canada. It was created in 1973 and operated by Travelways and Miller Transit Limited after 1984 on behalf of the then Town of Markham. The service was merged into York Region Transit in 2001 with Miller Transit continuing to operate most Markham routes.

History

Prior to 1973 public transit system were a patchwork of routes by various operators.

In the early 1800s stagecoaches or omnibuses ran along Yonge Street to hotels in Richmond Hill to York (Toronto) beginning from the 1820s.

Markham Village also had stagecoaches but from 1871 to 1980 it had passenger rail services by various operators (Toronto and Nipissing Railway, Midland Railway of Canada,  Grand Trunk Railway, Canadian National Railway and VIA Rail) before GO Transit began commuter rail service in 1982 as the Stouffville line.

In Thornhill privately owned Metropolitan Street Railway or Metropolitan line ran streetcars on Yonge Street serving Markham on the eastside from 1897 to 1930. Publicly owned (via TTC) North Yonge Railways provided radial electric railway service on Yonge Street from 1930 to 1948. From 1948 to 1977 Toronto Transit Commission (Toronto Transportation Commission before 1954) ran North Yonge (later as 59 North Yonge) bus route on Yonge. From 1977 to 2001, GO Transit 58 Bayview and Yonge C bus routes provided local suburban bus service, with the Yonge B providing express service.

Routes

Regular service

 1 North Trunk – ran along Highway 7
 2A – ran along 14th Avenue
 2 South Trunk – ran along Yonge Street, Doncaster Avenue, Henderson Avenue, John Street, Esna Park Drive, Denison Street, Elson Street, Middlefield Road (did not have stops from Finch Station to Steeles Avenue)
 3 Thornhill Local (Merged with Vaughan Transit route 8 to form existing YRT route 3 in 2002)
 4 Unionville/Markham Local (now YRT route 40 & 41)
 5 Buttonville North (merged with route 4 in 1998)
 7 16th Avenue (1998–1999, merged with Richmond Hill Transit Route 5 (now YRT route 16)
 8 Kennedy (since 1998)
 9 Markham Road (1998–2002, merged with TTC route 102)

Express / rush hour
 6 Brimley (rush hour service from Steeles Avenue East to 14th Avenue was cancelled circa 1997; this service was provided by TTC route 128A in the early 1990s)
 Unionville Express
 Markham Express
 Sunday and Holiday Express – ran along Yonge Street, John Street, Leslie Street and Highway 7

Contracted routes

There were a number or north–south routes operated for Markham Transit by other operators:

 Yonge B (express) and C (local) (GO Transit)
 58 Bayview (GO Transit)
 17A Birchmount (Toronto Transit Commission)
 129A McCowan North (TTC)
 43C Kennedy (TTC) 
 25D Don Mills (TTC) 
 68B Warden (TTC) 
 24C Victoria Park (TTC)
 Unionville (GO Transit Shuttle)

The TTC's 53 Steeles East was never operated on behalf of Markham Transit and did not require additional fares when buses ran fully within Markham to loop on-street at its eastern terminus. (53B/E used Middlefield Road, Elson Street and Markham Road from 1994 to 1999; after 1999 the route turned at McCowan Road north of Steeles, along Elson Street to Markham Road.)

Park 'n' ride

This service allowed patrons to park at select locations and board buses without paying for parking.

Park 'N Ride Locations included:
 Markham Village Community Centre
 Knob Hill Farms - northeast corner of Woodbine and Highway 7
 Former Fortinos store (now Denison Square Mall) – Denison Street and Kennedy Road
 Denison Square – Markham Road (Highway 48) and Denison Street
 Thornhill Community Centre
 First Markham Place

Additional services

Mobility Bus Service 

Markham Transit provided specialized services for the disabled and was similar to the TTC's WheelTrans. Separate wheelchair accessible vehicles were operated for this service. It also included Taxi Scrip, service for unplanned trips using contracted taxi operators.

Request Stop program

Similar services offered by the TTC for female patrons at night. This excluded routes from contractors (namely TTC and GO Transit), whom dictated their own Request Stop program.

Faster to Finch

Offered express connection between Markham Transit and GO Transit and 407 ETR to Finch Station.

Transcab

Introduced in the 1990s when Markham Transit did not operate night services. The hours of operations was after 7 p.m. Monday to Saturday. By the late 1990s, Markham Transit offered evening and Sunday service; this has been continued under YRT. Transcab was replaced by minibus shuttles in 1997.

Fleet

Many of Markham Transit's vehicles were second-hand, but more recent buses were new purchases.
They were maintained by the contractor.

Current YRT status (2005):

 1977, 1979, 1981 General Motors Diesel Division Buses T6H-4523N (#2001–#2006, #2014) – Retired in 2009.
 1979–1984 Ontario Bus Industries Orion I 01.501 (#2007–#2013, #2015–#2020) – Retired.
 1985–1988 Ontario Bus Industries Orion I 01.508 (#2021–#2025, #2027–#2030, #2033–#2036) – Retired.
 1966 General Motors Diesel Division Buses T6H-5303 (#2025) – Ex-Toronto Transit Commission #3758, retired
 1966 General Motors Diesel Division Buses T6H-5303 (#2026) – Ex-Toronto Transit Commission #3746, retired
 1971 General Motors Diesel Division Buses T6H-4523N (#2031) – Loaned Brampton Transit #9724, acquired in 1988
 1974 General Motors Diesel Division Buses T6H-4523N (#2032) – Loaned Brampton Transit #9741, acquired in 1988
 1967 General Motors Diesel Division Buses TDH-5303 (#2037) – Ex-Toronto Transit Commission #7113, acquired in 1989, retired
 1963 General Motors Diesel Division Buses TDH-4519 (#2038) – Ex-London Transit Commission #81-3, acquired in 1989, retired
 1969 General Motors Diesel Division Buses T6H-5305 (#2039) – Ex-Toronto Transit Commission #7371, acquired in 1989, retired
 1969 General Motors Diesel Division Buses T6H-5305 (#2040) – Ex-Toronto Transit Commission #7338, acquired in 1989, retired
 1969 General Motors Diesel Division Buses T6H-5305 (#2041–2042) – Ex-Toronto Transit Commission #7372–7373, acquired in 1989, retired
 1970 General Motors Diesel Division Buses T8H-5305A (#2043) – Ex-GO Transit #1015, acquired in 1989, retired
 1989 Motor Coach Industries TC-40102N Classic (#2044–#2047) – Retired in 2009.
 1990 Motor Coach Industries TC-40102A Classic (#2048–#2052) – Retired in 2009.
 OBI Orion V 05.501 
 1998 OBI Orion VI 06.501 (#2061–#2067) – Retired in 2011.
 Champion Bus Incorporated Solo – sold to BusAdvertising (DPI Transit Media) of Ajax ON  (#2055–#2060) – All retired
 1991 New Flyer Industries D40S (#2068–#2072) – Ex-GO Transit, all retired
 General Motors Diesel Division Buses T6H-XXXX – NG demonstrator from FIBA Canning, Scarborough

Past fleet

 GMC Flexette (#505)
 Denotes wheelchair-accessible vehicles.

Under Travelways the paint scheme used an olive/gold large arrow pointing to the front on a white background. A triple "m" logo on the front and sides. The word "Markham Transit" in black was found on both sides in front of the arrow.

With Miller the fleet replaced the colour scheme with reddish-brown and yellowish-gold on a white background with the town's word mark "Markham" on the sides near the rear.

Facilities

Markham Transit buses were stored at Miller Transit yard on Miller Avenue (Woodbine Avenue near present Highway 407). The buses were stored in an outside area on the east side of Woodbine.

Loops

 Middlefield Road and Denison Street – shared with the TTC
 McCowan Road and Steeles Avenue - owned by and shared with the TTC)
 Thornhill Town Centre
 Brimley Road north of Steeles Avenue East - owned by and shared with the TTC)

See also

 Richmond Hill Transit
 Vaughan Transit
 York Region Transit
 Newmarket Transit
 Toronto Transit Commission
 GO Transit
 Viva (bus rapid transit)
 Aurora Transit
 North Yonge Railways – provide transit service to the Yonge Street area of Markham (Thornhill) from 1930 to 1948
 Metropolitan / Lake Simcoe Line – provided transit service to the Yonge Street area from 1897 to 1930

References

 Markham Transit 1990 Rider's Guide
 Markham Transit Fall 1994 Rider's Guide
 Markham Transit Fall 1999 Rider's Guide
 Markham Transit 2000 Rider's Guide
 Transit History...Markham

Transport in Markham, Ontario
History of Markham, Ontario
Transit agencies in Ontario
York Region Transit